The following lists events that happened during 1941 in the Republic of Peru.

Incumbents
President: Manuel Prado Ugarteche
First Vice President: Rafael Larco Herrera
Second Vice President: Carlos D. Gibson
Prime Minister: Alfredo Solf y Muro

Events
July 5–31 - Ecuadorian–Peruvian War

Publications

Story 
 María Wiesse: Aves nocturnas

Births 
 October 27: Rodolfo Hinostroza, poet and astrologer.
 November 10: Ricardo Silva Santisteban, poet and translator.
 December 18: Luis Hernández, poet.

Deaths
July 23 - José Quiñones Gonzales

 
1940s in Peru
Years of the 20th century in Peru
Peru
Peru